We Are Family may refer to:

Film and television
 We Are Family (2010 film), an Indian drama
 We Are Family (2016 film), a French comedy
 We Are Family (2002 film), directed by Danny Schechter
 We Are Family (2006 Hong Kong film), directed by Clifton Ko
 We Are Family (2006 Singaporean film), produced by Chan Pui Yin
 "We Are Family" (Grounded for Life), a television episode
 "We Are Family" (Popular), a television episode

Music
 We Are Family (album), a 1979 album by Sister Sledge
 "We Are Family" (song), a 1979 song from the album
We Are Family, a 2009 album by Jeff & Sheri Easter
 "We Are (Family)", a theme song from the 2012 film Ice Age: Continental Drift

Other uses
 We Are Family Foundation, a nonprofit organization
 We Are Family (Slovakia), a political party

See also
 "We Are Family: Now Get Me Some Water!", an episode of Hannah Montana